See Khwae City Football Club (Thai สโมสรฟุตบอล สี่แคว ซิตี้), is a Thai professional football club based in Mueang, Nakhon Sawan, Thailand. The club is currently playing in the Thai League 3 Northern region.

History
In 2019, the club was established and competed in Thailand Amateur League Northern region, used Nakhon Sawan Sports School Stadium as ground. At the end of the season, the Phitsanulok provincial sports club that competing in the same division as the See Khwae City football club could promote a higher division (T3) for next season but they are not ready to compete in a higher division. So, The Phitsanulok provincial sports club had sold the right to the See Khwae City football club.

In 2020, the club become a professional football club, they began to selected youth players to training in the club's academy. See Khwae City competing in the Thai League 3 for the 2020–21 season by replacing the Phitsanulok provincial sports club. On October, 25th 2020, See Khwae City against Wat Bot City in the Thai League 3 Northern region, a player of See Khwae City has kicked the penalty kick out away because he thinks that penalty kick was unfair. In late December 2020, the Coronavirus disease 2019 or also known as COVID-19 had spread again in Thailand, the FA Thailand must abruptly end the regional stage of the Thai League 3. The club has finished the 6th place of the Northern region. In addition, See Khwae City has competed in the 2020–21 Thai FA Cup, they could pass the qualification round but defeated to Lamphun Warrior in the first round. In the 2020 Thai League Cup, See Khwae City have competed for this tournament but they have defeated to Phitsanulok in the second qualification round. However, the FA Thailand must cancel the Thai League Cup this year due to the spreading of the COVID-19.

In 2021, the 2021–22 season is the second consecutive season in the Thai League 3 of See Khwae City.

Stadium and locations

Season by season record

P = Played
W = Games won
D = Games drawn
L = Games lost
F = Goals for
A = Goals against
Pts = Points
Pos = Final position

QR1 = First Qualifying Round
QR2 = Second Qualifying Round
R1 = Round 1
R2 = Round 2
R3 = Round 3
R4 = Round 4

R5 = Round 5
R6 = Round 6
QF = Quarter-finals
SF = Semi-finals
RU = Runners-up
W = Winners

Players

Current squad

Coaching staff

References

External links
 Thai League official website
 Club's info from Thai League official website

Association football clubs established in 2019
Football clubs in Thailand
Nakhon Sawan province
2019 establishments in Thailand